ASVD may refer to:
 V.61, a standard for analog simultaneous voice and data
 Atherosclerosis or arteriosclerotic vascular disease, an artery disease